Victorina A. Abellanosa (1903 – 1968) was a Cebuano dramatist.

Plays
(mostly zarzuelas) 	 
 Ninoy 	
 Marti 	
 King Solomon

References
 —defunct

1968 deaths
1903 births
Visayan writers
Cebuano writers
Filipino dramatists and playwrights
20th-century Filipino women writers
20th-century Filipino writers